The Singapore Aviation Academy (SAA) is the primary educational and training facility of the Civil Aviation Authority of Singapore.

History
Singapore Aviation Academy was established in 1958 at Paya Lebar Air Base. In 1972 the school was relocated to larger facilities at Seletar Airport under the new nameCivil Aviation Training Centre (CATC). The CATS was renamed as the Singapore Aviation Academy in 1990.

Training

SAA offers training to civil aviation personnel in Singapore as well as overseas in the areas of aviation management, aviation safety and security, air traffic services and airport emergency services. Since 1958, SAA has trained over 91,000 participants from 200 countries. Since 2015 SAA became one of the first established by ICAO Regional Training Centres of Excellence.

Programmes

Main courses are:
 Master of Science in Aeronautics
 Master of Science in Air Transport Management

Academy also offers:
 Bachelors (on-line studies)
 MBAs and PhDs 
 Postgraduate Diplomas (on-line studies)

SAA is ISO 9001 certified for quality assurance in design and conduct of its training programmes. The Academy’s training programmes deal with solutions to meeting ICAO's standards and recommended practices.

Awards

See also

Civil Aviation Authority of Singapore

References

External links

Official website
Official Facebook page

Aviation schools in Singapore